The following lists events that happened during 1974 in Greece.

Incumbents
President: Phaedon Gizikis (until December 18), Michail Stasinopoulos (starting December 18)
Prime Minister: Adamantios Androutsopoulos (until 24 July), Konstantinos Karamanlis (starting 24 July)

Events

8 December: Republic referendum held, resulting in establishing a constitutional republic.

Births
 1 June – Akis Zikos, footballer and coach
 11 June – Foteini Varvariotou, artistic gymnast

Deaths

References

 
Years of the 20th century in Greece
Greece
Greece
1970s in Greece